Joyce Cherono Abonyo (née Laboso; 25 November 1960 – 29 July 2019) was a Kenyan politician who served as the second governor of Bomet County from 2017 until her death on 29 July 2019. She was a Member of Parliament representing Sotik constituency, before she was elected to the gubernatorial seat.

She was married to Dr. Edwin Abonyo, and had two sons. In 2008, she had to drop her husband's name and revert to Laboso because her marital status to a man from another community provided ammunition for her detractors to degrade her in her political journey.

Political Life
Joyce Laboso was elected to the Parliament of Kenya to represent the Sotik Constituency in a by-election held on 25 September 2008. She succeeded her sister, Lorna Laboso, who died in a plane crash. A nominee of the Jubilee Party, she beat 11 other contestants after she garnered 23,880 with  a vote margin of 10,000 over her closest challenger, retired Brigadier Alexander Sitienei (a former aide to Daniel arap Moi) who received 13,843 votes.

She was the ACP Co-president of the ACP–EU Joint Parliamentary Assembly.

She worked as a lecturer in the Department of Language and Linguistics at Egerton University and served as a Commissioner of the National Commission on Gender and Development.

Laboso was one of three first female governors in Kenya, along with Kitui County Governor Charity Ngilu and Kirinyaga County Governor Anne Waiguru. Laboso beat Isaac Rutto, the incumbent who had joined NASA Coalition. Rutto later conceded defeat in public.

Personal life
Laboso was first diagnosed with cancer in 1991. According to her husband, Edwin, Laboso managed to survive cancer for 28 years. The disease struck her again severely in March 2019. The family sought medical attention both in the UK and India, unfortunately, the doctors informed them that nothing much could be done to save the governor's life. She later succumbed to cancer on 29 July 2019 at Nairobi Hospital. A requiem service for her was conducted on 2 August 2019 and her burial was held at her home in Fort Ternan, Kisumu County on 3 August 2019.

References 

1960 births
2019 deaths
21st-century Kenyan women politicians
21st-century Kenyan politicians
Deaths from cancer in Kenya
Jubilee Party politicians
Members of the National Assembly (Kenya)
County Governors of Kenya
People from Bomet County